André Bergdølmo (born 13 October 1971) is a Norwegian former football defender. He was capable of playing in all defensive positions on the field, and while most often taking up a position on the left side, his favourite was that of right full back.

Bergdølmo began his senior career at Lillestrøm in 1991, before transferring to Rosenborg for a fee of  ahead of the 1997 season. From there, he went on to play for clubs in the Netherlands, Germany and Denmark, over a period of seven years from 2000 to 2007. He then returned to Norway, spending the final two years of his career at Strømsgodset. Upon retiring at the end of the 2008 season, Bergdølmo had won the League Championship seven times with three clubs, and earned 63 caps for the Norway national football team.

Club career
Bergdølmo started his playing career in Skjetten, and went from there to Lillestrøm in 1991, where he gradually became known as one of the best defenders in Norway. After six seasons at Åråsen, he went to Norwegian champion team Rosenborg in the spring of 1997. This move was controversial, and Bergdølmo fell out of favour with the Lillestrøm fans. The same year he made his national team debut.

Bergdølmo won four league titles with Rosenborg, and was ever-present for Norway at the Euro 2000. After the European Championships he was bought by Dutch giants Ajax. Used as a central defender, he helped to win the Dutch league title in 2002. In the summer of 2003 he moved on to German team Borussia Dortmund, where he played for two seasons before signing with F.C. Copenhagen in the summer of 2005. He made his debut for F.C. Copenhagen in a match against FC Nordsjælland on 31 July 2005, and his last match for the club was an UEFA Champions League match in Group F against Scottish Celtic on 26 September 2006. He reached 53 appearances for Copenhagen, scoring five goals, four of which on penalty.

He moved to Strømsgodset on 15 March 2007, where he signed a two-year contract. He retired at the end of the 2008 season, but would continue playing sporadically for Sørum on the eighth tier of Norwegian football.

International career
Bergdølmo made his debut for Norway on 18 January 1997, and was a regular since the late nineties. He played his last match on 12 November 2005, and amassed 63 caps in total.

Honours
Rosenborg
 Tippeligaen: 1997, 1998, 1999, 2000
Ajax
 Eredivisie: 2001–02
 KNVB Cup: 2001–02
 Johan Cruyff Shield: 2002
Copenhagen
 Superliga: 2005–06
 Royal League: 2004–05, 2005–06
Individual
 Kniksen of the Year: 2002

References

External links 
 
 

Association football fullbacks
Norwegian footballers
Lillestrøm SK players
Rosenborg BK players
AFC Ajax players
Borussia Dortmund players
F.C. Copenhagen players
Strømsgodset Toppfotball players
Eliteserien players
Eredivisie players
Bundesliga players
Danish Superliga players
Norway international footballers
UEFA Euro 2000 players
Kniksen Award winners
Norwegian expatriate footballers
Norwegian expatriate sportspeople in the Netherlands
Expatriate footballers in the Netherlands
Norwegian expatriate sportspeople in Germany
Expatriate footballers in Germany
Norwegian expatriate sportspeople in Denmark
Expatriate men's footballers in Denmark
People from Skedsmo
1971 births
Living people
Norwegian football managers
Kongsvinger IL Toppfotball managers
Sportspeople from Viken (county)